The Falconer's Arm II is the fifth studio album by composer and guitarist Robbie Basho, released in 1967 by Takoma Records.

Track listing

Personnel
Adapted from The Falconer's Arm II liner notes.
 Robbie Basho – steel-string acoustic guitar, vocals
 ED Denson – mastering
 Paul Kagan – photography
 Dan McCloskey – engineering
 Moe Moskowitz – executive producer

Release history

References

External links 
 

1967 albums
Robbie Basho albums
Takoma Records albums